These are the Billboard magazine R&B albums that reached number one in 1988.

Chart history

See also
1988 in music
R&B number-one hits of 1988 (USA)

1988